The Van's Aircraft RV-14 is an American aerobatic kit aircraft designed by Richard VanGrunsven and produced by Van's Aircraft. It was introduced at AirVenture in July 2012. The aircraft is supplied as a kit for amateur construction.

As of November 2022, 207 RV-14s have been completed and flown.

Design and development
Derived from the four-seat RV-10, RV-14 design work was commenced several years before its 2012 debut. It is an aerobatic two-seater designed to accommodate large pilots and offer greater baggage space, to comply with the US experimental amateur-built aircraft rules. The design goals included improved visibility, a wider cabin, a low landing speed achieved by larger and more effective flaps, good rate-of-climb and glide ratio, landing gear that meets FAR Part 23 certification standards and an airframe designed to accommodate the Lycoming IO-390 powerplant. It features a cantilever low-wing, a two-seats-in-side-by-side configuration enclosed cockpit under a bubble canopy, fixed tricycle landing gear and a single engine in tractor configuration.

The RV-14 is built from aluminum sheet. The prototype was fitted with a  Lycoming IO-390 four-stroke powerplant. The kit is intended to be easier to assemble than earlier Van's designs through the use of pre-punched and pre-formed fuselage longerons, pre-installed wiring, plug-in avionics, a pre-trimmed and ready-to-install bubble canopy, pre-welded canopy frame, pre-fitted engine baffles as well as matched pre-punched holes. The RV-14 offers several instrument panel choices, including one designed to take modern electronic flight instrument systems (EFIS), like the Dynon SkyView, without any additional cutting, as well as a blank panel that can be customized by the builder.

In July 2020 Van's introduced a new version of the Lycoming IO-390, designated as the IO-390-EXP119 and optimized for the RV-14. The engine has new exhaust and induction systems and puts out . It has a revised oil sump, aluminum induction pipes, oil pump and accessory case that saves  of weight. With this powerplant the RV-14 is  faster in cruise speed and climbs  faster.

The manufacturer offers aircraft type transition training and has built an RV-14 for this purpose.

Variants
RV-14
Two-seat conventional landing gear variant with tailwheel.
RV-14A
Two-seat tricycle landing gear variant.

Specifications (RV-14A)

References

External links

Video review by Mary Grady, AVweb
Review by Marc Cook, AVweb
AVweb Flight Review: Van’s RV-14A

Homebuilt aircraft
Single-engined tractor aircraft
RV-14
Low-wing aircraft
Aerobatic aircraft